Darron Paul Nell (born 3 August 1980) is a South African professional rugby union player who most recently with the . His usual positions are flanker and number 8.

Career

Free State Cheetahs / Cheetahs

He made his Currie Cup debut during the 2003 Currie Cup competition, starting their Round 3 match against  in Bloemfontein and helping his side to a 36–36 draw.

Nell made seven appearances during the 2004 Vodacom Cup competition, but missed the entire 2004 Currie Cup Premier Division campaign through injury.

Nell was a key member of the squad that played in the 2006 Vodacom Cup competition, starting 12 of their 13 matches during the competition and scoring four tries as they finished eighth in the competition. He remained an important player for their 2006 Currie Cup Premier Division campaign, where he also started in 12 of their matches during the season. The season ended in dramatic fashion as the two sides played out a 25–25 draw in the regulation 80 minutes and a 28–28 draw after extra time to share the title.

In 2007, Nell was also involved in Super Rugby for the first time. He once again played in the final, with the Cheetahs beating the  20–18 to win the title for the third consecutive season.

Castres

Nell joined French Top 14 team  in July 2008 and remained there for the 2008–09 and 2009–10 seasons. He made his Castres debut in August 2008 against , where his side suffered a 26–27 defeat. He played in a total of 14 matches for the side as they finished 12th in the competition, one place above the relegation zone. He also played three matches for the club in the 2008–09 Heineken Cup competition, but ended on the losing side in all three matches as Castres finished bottom of Pool 2.

Nell made nine appearances for Castres in the 2009–10 Top 14 season, a far more successful season for the side as they finished in 5th spot. He also started in five matches of their 2009–10 European Challenge Cup campaign, scoring his only try in Castres colours in a 47–0 victory over Italian side Rovigo as Castres finished third in Pool 3, failing to qualify to the knock-out stages.

Nell left Castres at the end of the 2009–2010 season, having scored one try in 31 appearances.

Eastern Province Kings / Southern Kings

During the Top 14 off-season in 2009, Nell returned to South Africa to represent the Southern Kings in their first ever match, a 20–8 defeat to the British & Irish Lions during their 2009 tour to South Africa.

Nell came on as a substitute in the final, helping his side to a 16–12 win to become First Division champions.

Nell scored two tries in four appearances during the 2011 Vodacom Cup, as a points deduction scuppered the Kings' chances of reaching the quarter-finals. In June 2011, he was selected in a Southern Kings side that competed in the 2011 IRB Nations Cup as the South African Kings.

Nell returned to domestic action, where he scored one try in eight appearances in the 2011 Currie Cup First Division season.

Nell was a vital part of the Kings' 2012 Currie Cup First Division squad; he played in thirteen matches as they reached the final of the competition for the third consecutive season. However, they once again failed to win their promotion/relegation series against Nell's former side  to remain in the First Division for 2013.

However, 2013 saw the  participate in Super Rugby for the first time. The Kings lost the series 44–42 on aggregate to lose their Super Rugby berth to the Lions.

In June 2014, he was selected in the starting line-up for the  side to face  during a tour match during a 2014 incoming tour and was also named captain of the team. He played the first 74 minutes of the match as the Kings suffered a 12–34 defeat. The Kings struggled to adjust to life in the Premier Division and lost their first nine matches of the season. They did, however, beat fellow promoted side the  26–25 in the final match of the season, with Nell playing the first 57 minutes of that match.

References

South African rugby union players
Eastern Province Elephants players
Southern Kings players
Living people
1980 births
Cheetahs (rugby union) players
Free State Cheetahs players
Castres Olympique players
People from Uitenhage
Rugby union locks
Rugby union players from the Eastern Cape